Estonia competed at the 2018 Summer Youth Olympics, in Buenos Aires, Argentina from 6 October to 18 October 2018.

A total of 23 competitors competed for Estonia, the highest number of athletes Estonia had so far sent to the Youth Olympic Games. All competitors qualified without needing an invitation. Estonia made its debut in four sports: archery, gymnastics, karate (new sport) and wrestling.

Medalists
Medals awarded to participants of mixed-NOC teams are represented in italics. These medals are not counted towards the individual NOC medal tally.

Competitors
The following is the list of number of competitors that participated at the Games per sport.

Archery

Estonia qualified one athlete for the boys event based on its performance at the 2017 World Archery Youth Championships.

Individual

Team

Athletics

Estonia qualified six athletes based on their performance at the 2018 European Athletics U18 Championships.

Boys
Track & road events

Field events

Girls
Track & road events

Field Events

Basketball

Estonia qualified both boys and girls team based on the FIBA U18 3x3 National Federation Ranking.

 Boys' tournament
Kerr Kriisa
Aleksander Oliver Hint
Arthur Herman Entsik
Jaan Erik Lepp

 Girls' tournament
Victoria-Ida Vähi (injured)
Johanna Eliise Teder
Janne Pulk
Martha Liisa Oinits

Girls' shoot-out contest

Gymnastics

Rhythmic gymnastics
Estonia qualified one rhythmic gymnast based on its performance at the European Qualification Event.

Girls

Mixed multidiscipline team

Karate

Estonia qualified one athlete based on the rankings in the Buenos Aires 2018 Olympic Standings.

Rowing

Estonia qualified one rower based on its performance at the 2018 European Rowing Junior Championships.

Swimming

Estonia qualified four athletes.

Boys

Girls

Wrestling

Estonia qualified one athlete based on its performance at the 2018 European Cadet Championships.

Girls

References

External links
NOC Schedule at buenosaires2018.com
Buenos Aires — Estonian Olympic Committee

2018 in Estonian sport
Nations at the 2018 Summer Youth Olympics
Estonia at the Youth Olympics